Kinga Maculewicz-De La Fuente (née Maculewicz; born 25 May 1978) is a French former volleyball player, a member of France women's national volleyball team between 1994 and 2011.

Personal life
She was born in Kraków, Poland, but she grew up in France. Her parents are Krystyna Maculewicz, a Polish former volleyball player and bronze medalist at the 1971 European Championship, and retired Polish footballer Henryk Maculewicz. She has an older half-sister, Monika. At age 18, she found out her biological father was Polish volleyball coach Andrzej Niemczyk; because of that she has three more half-sisters, also volleyball players: Małgorzata (born 1969), Saskia, and Natascha (born 1990). Natascha holds German nationality like her mother. She is married to Spanish volleyball player and 2007 European champion Enrique de la Fuente.

Career
In 2010-2011 she played for Polish club Atom Trefl Sopot. She ended her sporting career in 2011.

References

1978 births
Living people
Sportspeople from Kraków
French women's volleyball players
Polish women's volleyball players
Polish emigrants to France